The Notwist is the self-titled debut album from the German musical group The Notwist.  The record presents a side of the band which has subsided considerably during their recent recordings.  Early incarnations of the group saw them exploring very broad avenues of punk and metal, while they would later veer more toward an abstract electronic and indie feel.

Track listing
All songs written by Markus Acher, unless otherwise noted.

"Is It Fear?" – 3:08
"Bored" – 2:40
"Winter" – 3:18
"Crack It Open" – 2:32
"Be Reckless" – (Micha Acher) - 1:39
"K. das Devil" – 1:15
"One Wasted" – 3:24
"Agenda" – 2:32
"I've Not Forgotten You" – 2:56
"M. del Terror" – 1:40
"Seasons" – 3:32
"Think For Yourself" – 1:26
"Nothing Like You" – 3:55

Personnel
 Markus Acher - guitar, lead vocals (all but 11)
 Micha Acher - bass
 Martin Messerschmid - drums
 Evil David - lead vocals (11), backing vocals (1)
 Christoph Merk - backing vocals (2)

Charts

References

1991 debut albums
The Notwist albums